Jaroslav Havlíček (3 February 1896 – 7 April 1943) was a Czech novelist. He was an exponent of naturalism and psychological novel in Czech literature.

Life 
Jaroslav Havlíček was born in a teacher's family in Jilemnice, Liberec Region. He studied gymnasium in Jičín and then courses of commercial economics. Shortly after he entered ČVUT he was drafted to serve in the Austrian army in Kadaň from where he soon went to front (Russia, Italy). After World War I he finished his studies and became an official. He married Marie Krausová, daughter to a Jilemnice soapmaker, in 1921.  He is father to Zbyněk Havlíček.

Work 
His novels are usually situated to a provincial town with clear signs of Jilemnice at the turn of the 20th century. His masterpiece is a novel called originally Vyprahlé touhy (Thirsty Lusts, 1935) and re-written by the author under the name Petrolejové lampy (Kerosene Lamps, 1944). Most of his novels (Neviditelný/Invisible, Vlčí kůže/Wolf's Skin, Helimadoe) are psychological novels about young men and women and their relationships in extreme conditions.

External links 
 Several works by Jaroslav Havlíček available on the website of the Municipal Library in Prague (in Czech)

Czech novelists
Male novelists
Czech male writers
1896 births
1943 deaths
Czech Technical University in Prague alumni
20th-century novelists
Psychological fiction writers
20th-century male writers
People from Jilemnice